Theodore Reed (June 18, 1887 – February 22, 1959) was an American film director, producer and former president of the Academy of Motion Picture Arts and Sciences.

Selected filmography
 Say! Young Fellow (1918)
 Arizona (1918)
 When the Clouds Roll By (1919)
 The Nut (1921)
 Lady Be Careful (1936)
 Double or Nothing (1937)
 Tropic Holiday (1938)
 What a Life (1939)
 I'm from Missouri (1939)
 Life with Henry (1941)
 Her First Beau (1941)
 Song of My Heart (1948)

External links

1887 births
1959 deaths
Presidents of the Academy of Motion Picture Arts and Sciences
American film directors
Artists from Cincinnati
Film producers from Ohio